Town Doctors' House and Site is a historic home located at Southold in Suffolk County, New York. The house was built about 1720, and expanded in about 1880, 1930, and 2002–2003.  The house is a -story, northern-Colonial–style building with a cross-gabled roof and central chimney.  The site includes Bilberry Swamp, where the earliest Euro-American occupation occurred around 1664.  There is evidence on the site of pre-17th-century occupation by Native Americans.

It was added to the National Register of Historic Places in 2005.

References

Archaeological sites in New York (state)
Houses in Suffolk County, New York
National Register of Historic Places in Southold (town), New York